Rajper, or Rajpar, is a Sammat tribe in Sindh, Pakistan. They are descendants of Jam Hothi son of Unar, Whereas in another tradition they are mentioned as descendants of Thebo son of Unar. Rajper literally means "son Raja". 

Rajpar community has over 70 sub caste in Sindh. Majority of Rajpar lives in Naushehro Feroz, Khairpur district, Nawab Shah district, Sanghar  District, Sukkur District, and Larkana District. Rajpar are mainly landlords, before creation of Pakistan they collected taxes on the Sindhu Darya.

Rajpar were among the supporters for Soomras to establish rule in Sindh. Current chief of Rajper tribe is Sardar Khalid Mian Khan Rajper, who is son of Ahmed Khan Rajper former headman of Rajper community.

Rajpar society
The Rajpars have many Parhaas (separate subcastes). These are not included in most names and many simply have Rajpar in their name. The Rajpars have a Sardar who is in charge of the Parhas although his authority is minimal, he has a lot of influence for the Rajpar community. Rajpers prefer to live in the village and to look after the businesses of their forefathers. Unlike most villages, Rajpers have electricity, gas, wide roads, transport facilities, a proper drainage system, schools, dispensaries/hospitals, and mini  mills in their village. Women in this tribe are held high in respect.

Major Rajpar subcastes
The Rajper group has over 70 subcastes although the ones mentioned here are the 50 major subcastes:

Baghar, Bhaabhan, Bhaudinja, Chooharja, Dangeja, Daharja, Deenarja, Dodayja, Gagangja, Husinja, Haji, Jamerja, Jaara, Sameja, Jeendayja, Jeeyapota, Jogi, Jubairja, Khairayja, Kubar, Lakheja, Lakhuja, Meharja, Makai, Mojai, Maandar, Moheyja, Mulla, Mudafarja, Nanagoor, Paata, Pasaaya, Patuja, Puryari, Saheja, Sahaypota, Sadar, Samdani, Samaa, Samaari, Sanjarja, Sadri, Salaarja, Shahbaigja, Shiekuja, Tugruja, Uddheja, Veesar, Wedhar and Wadhaari.

Notable personalities

 Sardar Ahmed Khan Rajpar I, MLA and Minister in Sindh government during 1953-55.
 Sardar Fateh Khan Rajpar I
 Sardar Ahmed Khan Rajpar II
 Sardar Fateh Khan Rajpar II
 Sardar Khalid Mian Rajpar, Pakistani politician
 Naseem Rajpar, Pakistani politician
 Mushtaq Rajpar, Writer
 Aleena Rajpar, PSP
 Abdul Sattar Rajper, Pakistani politician
 Ameer Bukhash Rajpar Member sindh Council of PAKISTAN PEOPLES  PARTY 
 Manzar Rajpar poet and custom officer 
 Khalid Rajpar poet, and officer is sindh building controll authority  
 Yasheb Rajpar, Cricketer, Central East Region cricket team, USA.

References

External links 

 Rajpars history

Sindhi tribes
Social groups of Pakistan